"Encontré el amor" (English: I Found Love) was released as a promotional single from the band Selena y Los Dinos in 1983 from Selena's second album The New Girl in Town.

Charts

References

1983 singles
Selena songs
Song recordings produced by A. B. Quintanilla
1983 songs
Song articles with missing songwriters